Abdoul Moubarak Aïgba (born 5 August 1997) is a Togolese footballer who plays as a goalkeeper for Sofapaka and the Togo national team.

Career
Aïgba began his career with Togolese side Ifodje Atakpamé, before moving to AS Douanes in 2016. After a long transfer saga, he moved to the Kenyan club Sofapaka in March 2021.

International career
Aïgba made his debut with the Togo national team in a 0–0 2020 African Nations Championship qualification tie with Benin on 28 July 2021.

References

External links
 
 Sofapaka Profile

1997 births
Living people
People from Kara, Togo
Togolese footballers
AS Douanes (Togo) players
Sofapaka F.C. players
Togo international footballers
Association football goalkeepers
Kenyan Premier League players
Togolese expatriate footballers
Togolese expatriates in Kenya
Expatriate footballers in Kenya
21st-century Togolese people